Bhavana is a Pali/Sanskrit word (bhāvana) that means 'development' or 'cultivating' or 'producing'.  It, or variant Bhavna, are a popular girl's name and may refer to:

 Bhavana, Pali term

People
 Bhavana (actress), (born 1986) Indian actress born Karthika Menon
 Bhavana (Kannada actress) (ಭಾವನಾ ರಾಮಣ್ಣ), Indian actress born Nandini Ramanna
 Bhavana Balakrishnan (born 1986), Indian television anchor
 Bhavana Balsavar, Indian film / television actress
 Bhavana Bhatt, Bollywood actress
 Bhavana Gawali, Shiv Sena politician
 Bhavana Radhakrishnan (born 1961), Indian playback singer in Malayalam cinema
 Bhavana Rao, Dancer, Indian actress also known as Shikha
 Bhavna Pani, Indian actress
 Bhavna, Bhavna Limbachia, UK actress

Other
Bhavna (film), film